The Thuận Phước Bridge is a suspension bridge that crosses the lower Han River at Da Nang, Vietnam.

The four-lane, three-span, bridge is 1,850 meters long and 18 meters wide, and has a main span of 405 meters. Its two major pillars are 80m in height. It is the longest suspension bridge in Vietnam, with total investment of nearly 1 trillion dong. The bridge was built with an estimated cost of VND 650 billion (about 42 million US dollars). Consulting firms from China, Cuba and Canada provided assistance.

The construction of the bridge, which began in 2003, was completed on 19 July 2009 when the Prime Minister of Vietnam Nguyen Tan Dung and many high-ranking government officials attended the inauguration ceremony.

See also
 Han River Bridge
 Dragon River Bridge

References

External links
The Thuan Phuoc Bridge at Bridgemeister.com

Road bridges in Vietnam
Bridges completed in 2009
Bridges in Da Nang
Suspension bridges in Vietnam